Hebden Royd is a civil parish in the metropolitan borough of Calderdale, West Yorkshire, England. It contains 254 listed buildings that are recorded in the National Heritage List for England. Of these, twelve are at Grade II*, the middle of the three grades, and the others are at Grade II, the lowest grade. The parish contains the market town of Hebden Bridge, the large village of Mytholmroyd, the valley to the south of Mytholmroyd which contains the village of Cragg Vale, and the surrounding area.

Most of the listed buildings in the parish are houses and associated structures, cottages, farmhouses, and farm buildings. Almost all the buildings are in stone with stone slate roofs, and most of the windows are mullioned. The River Calder and the Rochdale Canal run through the parish, and the listed buildings associated with these are bridges, locks, an aqueduct, two overflow facilities, and a lock-keeper's house. The railway built by the Manchester and Leeds Railway also runs through the parish, and the listed buildings associated with this are two viaducts, parts of Mytholmroyd railway station and Hebden Bridge railway station, the latter built later by the Lancashire and Yorkshire Railway, and a signal box. The other listed buildings include road bridges and footbridges, boundary stones, guide posts, milestones, public houses, former mills, factories and workshops, churches and chapels, some of which have been converted for other purposes, a school, former public buildings, a cinema, two war memorials, and a telephone kiosk.


Key

Buildings

References

Citations

Sources

Lists of listed buildings in West Yorkshire
Listed